Jean-Paul C. Montagnier (born September 28, 1965 at Lyon) is a French musicologist. He studied at the Conservatoire National Supérieur de Musique de Paris, where he received two first prizes in musical analysis (1988, professor: Claude Ballif) and music history (1989, professor: Yves Gérard), before completing a PhD at Duke University under the supervision of Professor Peter Williams (1994). He is currently Professor of musicology at the University of Lorraine (Nancy, France), and Associate Member of the Institut de Recherche en Musicologie (CNRS). He also was Adjunct Professor at McGill University. He was involved with Musica Gallica, an edition of the works of the musical patrimony of France. He serves on the editorial board of the Collected Works of Jean-Baptiste Lully published by Olms (Germany). He was made Officer in the Order of Arts and Letters by the French Government in 2012, and Chevalier in the Ordre National du Mérite in 2021. He was nominated to become a Robert M. Trotter Visiting Distinguished Professor at the University of Oregon School of Music and Dance during the 2018–2019 academic year.

He specializes in the sacred music of the French Baroque, and has extensively published in numerous international journals. In addition to several books and book chapters, he has also edited many scores and facsimiles. He is regularly invited to lecture and teach in North-American and European universities.

He is a member of several learned societies, among which the American Musicological Society, the Royal Musical Association, and the International Musicological Society.

His grandfather, Georges Montagnier (1892-1967), was a novelist, playwright and poet.

Books 
 La vie et l’œuvre de Louis-Claude Daquin (1694-1772). Lyon: Aléas Editeur, 1992. .
 Un mécène-musicien: Philippe d’Orléans, Régent (1674-1723). Paris: Éditions Auguste Zurfluh, 1996. . 
 Charles-Hubert Gervais (1671-1744), un musicien au service du Régent et de Louis XV. Paris: CNRS Editions, 2001. .
 Henry Madin, Louis-Joseph Marchand: traités de contrepoint simple ou de chant sur le livre. Edited by J.-P. C. Montagnier. Paris: Société française de musicologie, 2004. .
 Henry Madin (1698-1748), un musicien Lorrain au service de Louis XV. Preface by Davitt Moroney. Langres: Editions Dominique Guéniot, 2008. .
 Nicolas Bernier: Principes de composition, fac-similé du manuscrit Rés. Vmb ms. 2 de la Bibliothèque nationale de France. Edited by J.-P. C. Montagnier. Langres: Editions Dominique Guéniot, 2009. .
 Georges Montagnier, Œuvres complètes. Edited by J.-P. C. Montagnier. Nancy, Langres: J.-P. C. and Ph. Montagnier, 2011. .
 Georges Montagnier (1892-1967). Un écrivain lyonnais de l'entre-deux-guerres. Edited by J.-P. C. Montagnier. Nancy: J.-P. C. and Ph. Montagnier, 2013. .
 The Polyphonic Mass in France, 1600-1780. The Evidence of the Printed Choirbooks. Cambridge: Cambridge University Press, 2017. .
 Catalogue des œuvres de Jules-Marie Laure Maugüé (Nancy, 1869–Paris, 1953) et autres documents sur sa vie et son œuvre. Nancy: The Author, 2019. .

References

20th-century French musicologists
21st-century French musicologists
French music theorists
Conservatoire de Paris alumni
Duke University alumni
Officiers of the Ordre des Arts et des Lettres
Writers from Lyon
1965 births
Living people